Miss Earth 2014, the 14th edition of the Miss Earth pageant, was held on November 29, 2014 at the University of the Philippines Theater, inside the campus of the University of the Philippines Diliman in Quezon City, Philippines. Alyz Henrich of Venezuela crowned her successor Jamie Herrell of the Philippines at the end of the event.

There were 85 contestants competed for this year's pageant.

Pop singer Charice Pempengco graced the Miss Earth stage by singing Beyoncé's "Pretty Hurts".

The pageant's theme was promoting ecotourism which aims to raise awareness to the tourists and travelers regarding ecological conservation in order to directly benefit the economic development and to foster respect for different cultures and for human rights.

Results

Placements

Medal table

Challenge Events

Darling of the Press

Best Teacher

Talent Competition

Miss Photogenic (Online Voting)

Cocktail Wear Competition

Evening Gown Competition

Resort Wear Competition

Miss Friendship
Each group of the Miss Earth 2014 took a bit of time off from their rigid (but fun) rehearsals to cast their votes for the special title of Miss Friendship.

Swimsuit Competition

Eco-Beauty Video

National Costume

Beauty for a Cause

Order of announcements

Top 16

Top 8

Judges
 Richie de Quina - My Phone Vice President for Marketing and Business Development from the Philippines.
 Olivier Ochanine - Head conductor of Philippine Philharmonic Orchestra from the Philippines.
 Allison Harvard - American model, artist, actress, and Internet celebrity, best known as the runner-up of both cycle 12 of America's Next Top Model and America's Next Top Model: All-Stars
 Dennis Perez - Unilever Philippines Media Director from the Philippines
 Matthieu Penot - Attache environment energy and climate change of the European Union to the Philippines
 Sebastian Caudron - Regional Director GroupM Interaction Indonesia & Philippines
 Joseph King - Owner at M&S Investments, Chairperson at North Asia Resources Group, Partner at Richland Capital and former Vice President at Blackstone Capital Partners Asia from the Philippines
 Jake Macapagal - Actor-producer; Lead star in the British film Metro Manila from the Philippines
 Ingrid Chua-Go - Fashion and lifestyle blogger based in Manila, Philippines; Known for her fashion blog The Bag Hag Diaries and her society blog, Manila Social Diary. She blogs for The Huffington Post-UK and writes columns for both the Philippine Daily Inquirer. from the Philippines
 Panfilo Lacson - Filipino politician who served as Philippine senator, who served from 2001 to 2013. He served as the Director-General of the Philippine National Police from 1999 to 2001 before being elected to the Senate from the Philippines.

Notes

  During the official introduction of the panel of judges, Chua-Go wasn't present during the first few minutes of the pageant's telecast. Lorraine Schuck, the Executive Vice President of Carousel Productions, took over temporarily the seat as they await the arrival of Chua-Go, who was late due to traffic for going to the venue itself. Schuck only judged the swimsuit competition, while Chua-Go managed to judge the succeeding rounds.

Background music
 Opening: "Fireball" (Jump Smokers Remix) by Pitbull featuring John Ryan / "Woman of the Earth" by Samantha Monzon
 Swimsuit Competition: "Rather Be" (Lash Remix) by Clean Bandit featuring Jess Glynne
 Evening Gown Competition: "La La La" (Piano and Violin cover by Jegs), (original song by Naughty Boy featuring Sam Smith)

Contestants
85 delegates competed:

Notes

Debuts

Returns

 Last competed in 2001:
 
 Last competed in 2007:
 
 Last competed in 2010:
 
 
 Last competed in 2011:
 
 
 Last competed in 2012:

Withdrawals
During the contest
  – Laëtizia Penmellen withdrew from the competition 3 days before the final claiming because she had a virus.s

Before the contest

Did not compete

  – Doroilda Kroni	
  – Eugenia de Pina
  – Carolina Yanuzzi
  – Chancé Chantele Gatoro
  – Brenda Muñoz
  – Kaltrina Neziri
  – Claire-Louise Catterall
  – Aybüke Pusat
  – Yasmine Alley

Designations
  – Letícia Silva was appointed as "Miss Earth Brazil 2014" by Miss Terra Brasil Organization. The national contest would be held later part this year for the competition next year.
  – Ana Batarelo was appointed as "Miss Earth Croatia 2014" by Miss Croatia Organization after seeing Ana's personal Facebook account.
  – María José Maza was appointed as "Miss Earth Ecuador 2014" by "Diosas, Escuela de Misses".
  – Zoe McCracken was appointed as "Miss Earth Fiji 2014" by Miss Earth Pacifica.
  – Arta Muja has been designated as "Miss Earth Germany 2014" by the national director. The franchise of Miss Earth in Germany is under a new team.
  – Nana Ama Odame-Okyere has been designated as "Miss Earth Ghana 2014" by the national director. The contest would be held early 2015 for the Miss Earth 2015.
  – Thalia Raquel Carredano has been designated as "Miss Earth Guatemala 2014" by the national director in Guatemala.
  – Sydney Van De Bosch was appointed as "Miss Earth Hungary 2014". She is Miss Hungary World 2014 2nd runner-up.
  – Tugsuu Idersaikhan has been designated as "Miss Earth Mongolia 2014". The original winner resigned because of commitment issues.
  – Elba Fahsbender was crowned as "Miss Earth Peru 2014" by Miss Peru Organization. She was Miss World Peru 2013.
  – Franceska Toro was appointed as "Miss Earth Puerto Rico 2014" by Shanira Blanco, the national director of Miss World Puerto Rico Organization. She was the 1st Runner-up of Miss World Puerto Rico 2014.
  – Patrycja Dorywalska was appointed as "Miss Earth Poland 2014" due to the rescheduling of the Miss Polonia 2014 pageant to December 2014. She was Miss Polonia 2012 top 5 finalist.
  – Natasha Westropp was appointed as "Miss Earth Samoa 2014" by Miss Earth Pacifica.
  – Sicilia Makisi was appointed as "Miss Earth Tonga 2014" by Miss Earth Pacifica.
  – Esonica Veira was appointed as "Miss Earth U.S. Virgin Islands 2014". She was Miss US Paradise Supranational 2013.
  – Valeriia Poloz was appointed as "Miss Earth Ukraine 2014". She was a finalist in Queen of Ukraine in 2013.

Replacements
  – Dayanna Grageda, the reigning Miss Earth Australia, got dethroned for failing to fulfill her duties. She was replaced by Miss Fire, Nadine Roberts.
  – Cheryl Ortega withdrew due to her studies. Mayté Brito who was originally set to compete in the following year replaced her.
  – Catherine Kanaan has been replaced by Tala Safadi for undisclosed reasons.
  – Barbara Gomes withdrew due to family reasons. Raquel Fontes, who would originally compete in Miss Humanity, replaced Gomes.
  – Miss Venezuela Organization decided not to allow Stephanie de Zorzi to compete due to weight issues. Maira Rodríguez, the Miss Earth Venezuela 2014 who would compete the following year and de Zorzi's successor, replaced her to compete in this edition instead.

International broadcasters
 Asia-Pacific – STAR World Asia, Rappler
  – TV Asahi
  – MASTV via Dish México
  – STAR World Philippines, ABS-CBN
  – Univision

Notes

  Webcast Partner and bringing Live Chat Updates from the Venue. The replay of Miss Earth 2014 full show will be uploaded via Rappler's official YouTube channel.
  Delayed Telecast on 30 November 2014 (10:00 a.m. Philippine Standard Time)
  Is an American Spanish language broadcast television network that is owned by Univision Communications. The network's programming is aimed at Hispanic and Latino Americans in the United States.

References

External links

 

2014
2014 beauty pageants
Beauty pageants in the Philippines
2014 in the Philippines